Preecha Ruangjan (Born on 4 June 1955 –) is a Thai civil servant. He served as governor of Phuket Province, Nakhon Sawan Province, Phichit Province and Phitsanulok Province. He was a professor in Naresuan University.

Early life 
He was born on 4 June 1955 in a poor farmer family. He graduated primary from Wat Nong Kophai School and returned to help his family to farm. He completed high school and attended the Faculty of Political Science (International Relations) at Chulalongkorn University. He graduated with a bachelor's degree, and a doctorate in political studies from Cebu Doctors' University.

Career
In 1975, he served as government policy scholar at Phetchabun province. He the served as assistant district officer, and assistant province officer at many settlements. In 2008, he attended the governor at Phuket Province until 2009. He transferred to governor at Nakhon Sawan Province, Phichit Province and Phitsanulok Province until he retired in 2014. Much of the Thai people's cultural identity reflects his role as a Thai monarchist and support for a sufficiency economy, in line withThai king Bhumibol Adulyadej.

Personal life
He married Piyathida Nararak. and raised two children, including P. Praphassanan Ruangjan and P. Nonthanan Ruangjan.

References 

Preecha Ruangjan
Preecha Ruangjan
1937 births
Living people
Preecha Ruangjan
Preecha Ruangjan